Majestic is the second live album by Christian singer and songwriter Kari Jobe. It is her second release with Sparrow Records. The album was recorded at the Majestic Theatre in Dallas, Texas, was produced by Jeremy Edwardson and released on March 25, 2014. It has attained critical acclamation and commercial successes.

Background and recording 

The material took two years to develop for the release. According to Jobe, the music is about helping people connect with the majesty of God and His son Jesus Christ, whether they are a believer or not. She said that she could not get the lyrics made by herself alone that is why she teamed-up with others, but in doing this she had to allow herself to be vulnerable in getting out of her "comfort zone". The album was recorded at the Majestic Theatre in Dallas, Texas during the performances on November 20–21, 2013. It was produced by Jeremy Edwardson. The album released on March 25, 2014 by Sparrow Records.

Composition and musical style 

The songs "Hands To the Heavens", "Only Your Love" and "How Majestic" are in the Brit-rock genre. "Hands To the Heavens" features electric guitars and "solid drumming". However, a critic did not like the arrangement of the bridge section because it would be hard to utilize in a corporate worship setting. "Breathe On Us" is a more "up-tempo" track in comparison to its predecessor. "Only Your Love" is a "jazzy song", with a guitar lead. "Keeper of My Heart" contains "marching" drums, and "stirring" electric guitar work. "Always Enough" is a soft worship anthem with "rousing" guitars, "an epic" crescendo, and "a captivating" instrumental bridge to the song. The piano-led "Forever" is a ballad and a worship anthem. "How Majestic" is an anthemic worship-esque song. "When You Walk In the Room" contains a "stellar" crescendo. "I Am Not Alone" is a "gorgeous" and "poignant" ballad, which contains a "rich" piano lead. "Lord Over All" is a mid-tempo song that is a guitar-driven anthem. "Look Upon the Lord" is a delicate piano ballad, which contains "Coldplay-esque swelling guitars." "Let the Heavens Open" is a Brit-rock song, which is in the vein of Delirious?.

Critical reception 

Majestic garnered critical acclaim from eight music critics ratings and eleven reviews. At CCM Magazine, Caroline Lusk rated the album four stars out of five, remarking that "From the opening strands, it's clear that Majestic is not just an album; it's an experience." Jeremy Armstrong of Worship Leader rated the album four-and-a-half stars out of five, observing how "Majestic is at once overwhelming and intimate; it creates space for the Spirit to dwell and it fills all the sonic landscape with music that supports the prayers of the people." At New Release Tuesday, Kevin Davis rated the album four-and-a-half stars out of five, affirming that "Majestic is about proclaiming the majesty of God and crying out for His presence throughout this incredible worship experience, which stirs my heart, mind and soul to bow before Jesus, our Majestic King." At Christian Music Review, Jay Heilman rated the album a four-point seven out of five, thinking that "Majestic will stand the test of time and rank up there with some of the all-time greatest live worship projects."

At Louder Than the Music, Jono Davies rated the album four-and-a-half stars, noting how the release contains "so many powerful moments." Christian Music Zine's Joshua Andre rated the album a four and three fourths out of five, highlighting that with respect to this release "there's no doubting the passion, enthusiasm and strong faith for Jesus that Kari has." Andrew Funderburk of CM Addict rated the album four stars out of five, and according to him "It seems [...] that Kari Jobe's music is progressively getting better and better", and indicating how "Her experiences shine through it all." At All About Worship, Adam Hellyer gave a positive review, stating that "It's a well written, well produced worship album, which does what it says on the label." Kim Jones of Music Times gave a positive review, saying that "Every song on Majestic shines with an unchanging thirst for God's presence", and writes that "the bar was high for her first live worship album and she didn't just meet the challenge, she exceeded it."

Mark D. Geil of Jesus Freak Hideout rated the album three-and-a-half stars out of five, and according to him "Majestic therefore becomes extra-tricky, since it's a live album meant to recreate not so much a concert as a worship experience, and it's introducing all-new music at the same time." However, Geil states that "The songs are strong enough that they don't rely on a live setting with a fervent audience to communicate praise", but cautioned that "they might have spoken louder without the audience." At Hallels, Timothy Yap gave a mixed review, cautioning that "'Majestic' does [have] its share of magnificently written ballads sung tenderly and passionately by Jobe, but whether or not this album works well for congregational worship is another issue."

Accolades 

This album was No. 3 on the Worship Leader'''s Top 20 Albums of 2014 list.

The song, "Forever (We Sing Hallelujah)", was No. 1 on the Worship Leader's Top 20 Songs of 2014 list.

 Commercial performance 

For the Billboard charting week of April 12, 2014, Majestic'' was the No. 12 most sold album in the entirety of the United States via the Billboard 200, and it was the No. 1 most sold album in the Christian Albums market. Also, it was the fourth most sold Digital Album.

Track listing

Personnel 

 Jonathan Berlin – additional production, guitar, keyboards
 Natasha Brown – photography
 Anna Byrd- background vocals
 Cody Carnes –  featured artist, acoustic guitar, vocals
 Jess Chambers – A&R
 Austin Davis –  drums
 David Dobson – photography
 Jeremy Edwardson – engineer, producer
 Sam Gibson – mixing
 Trey Gunn – string arrangements
 Michael Howell – engineer
 Jimmy James – executive producer
 Caleb Jobe – drums, percussion
 Kari Jobe –  creative director, executive producer, primary artist
 Tore Kulleseid – guitar, production assistant
 Jeffrey Kunde – electric guitar
 Drew Lavyne – mastering
 Anton Patzner – string arrangements, violin
 Lewis Patzner – cello
 Grant Pittman – keyboards, piano, programming
 Isaac Roman – violin
 Dustin Sauder – electric guitar, background vocals
 Sarah Sung – artwork, design
 Christopher York – A&R, executive producer

Charts

References 

2014 live albums
Kari Jobe albums
Sparrow Records live albums